Romance Town is a 2011 South Korean television series starring Sung Yu-ri, Jung Gyu-woon, Kim Min-jun, and Min Hyo-rin. It aired on KBS2 from May 11 to July 14, 2011 on Wednesdays and Thursdays at 21:55 for 20 episodes.

Plot
Noh Soon-geum is a spunky young woman whose mother and grandmother worked as housemaids, and due to poverty, finds herself continuing the tradition.

Determined to keep her irresponsible father away from her money, Soon-geum stays on at her job and keeps her newfound wealth (stashed away in boxes and boxes of cash) a secret from the residents of her ritzy neighborhood, including her maid friends and her boss's irritable, disagreeable son Kang Gun-woo, with whom she shares a past. But as Soon-geum and Gun-woo later fall in love, her secret eventually gets revealed, and greed and betrayal mount in the neighborhood, from maids and masters alike.

Cast
 Sung Yu-ri as Noh Soon-geum
 Jung Gyu-woon as Kang Gun-woo 
 Kim Min-jun as Kim Young-hee
 Min Hyo-rin as Jung Da-kyum
 Park Ji-young as Oh Hyun-joo
 Lee Kyung-shil as Uhm Soo-jung
 Kim Jae-in as Yoon Shi-ah
 Joo Jin-mo as Noh Sang-hoon
 Lee Jae-yong as Kang Tae-won
 Yang Jung-a as Seo Yoon-joo 
 Jo Hwi-joon as Kang San
 Ban Hyo-jung as Yoo Choon-jak
 Kim Ye-won as Thu Zar Lin
 Jo Sung-ha as Hwang Yong
 Claudia Kim as Hwang Joo-won
 Lee Jung-gil as Jang Chi-gook
 Shin Shin-ae as Kim Soon-ok
 Kwon Ki-seon as Oh Boon-ja
 Kim Dong-beom as Choi, convenience store clerk
 Heo Tae-hee as Son Jin-pyo
 Im Ye-jin as Soon-geum's mother
 Kim Ji-young as Soon-geum's grandmother
 Go In-beom as Sang-hoon's friend
 Kim Yang-woo as burglar
 Choi Jae-hwan as burglar

International broadcast
It aired in Japan on TBS beginning April 9, 2012.
It aired in Thailand on Workpoint TV.

References

External links
  
 
 

Korean Broadcasting System television dramas
2011 South Korean television series debuts
2011 South Korean television series endings
Korean-language television shows
South Korean romantic comedy television series
Television series by CJ E&M
Television shows written by Seo Sook-hyang